Islamuddin Shaikh is a Pakistani politician who has been a member of Senate of Pakistan since March 2015.

Political career

He was elected to the Senate of Pakistan as a candidate of Pakistan Peoples Party (PPP) in 2009 Pakistani Senate election.

He was re-elected to the Senate of Pakistan as a candidate of PPP in 2015 Pakistani Senate election.

References

Living people
Pakistani senators (14th Parliament)
Pakistan People's Party politicians
Year of birth missing (living people)